Adelpha radiata, the striated sister, is a butterfly of the family Nymphalidae. It was described by Hans Fruhstorfer in 1915. It is found from Costa Rica and Panama to Ecuador, Venezuela, French Guiana and Brazil.

Subspecies
A. r. radiata (Brazil: Rio de Janeiro to Santa Catharina)
A. r. aiellae Willmott & Hall, 1999 (Panama to western Ecuador)
A. r. explicator Willmott & Hall, 1999 (eastern Ecuador)
A. r. gilletella Brévignon, 1995 (French Guiana)
A. r. myrlea Fruhstorfer, 1915 (Brazil: Espirito Santo to Rio de Janeiro)
A. r. romeroi Willmott & Neild, 2003 (Venezuela)

References

 Adelpha radiata at Insecta.pro

Butterflies described in 1915
Adelpha
Lepidoptera of French Guiana
Fauna of Brazil
Nymphalidae of South America
Taxa named by Hans Fruhstorfer